Ben Ramsey may refer to:
 Ben Ramsey (politician)
 Ben Ramsey (filmmaker)